Aveley is a town and former civil parish in the unitary authority of Thurrock in Essex, England, and forms one of the traditional Church of England parishes. Aveley is 16 miles (26.2 km) east of Charing Cross. In the 2021 United Kingdom census it had a population of 9,801. In 1931 the parish had a population of 2,003.

Position
Aveley is located on the very edge of Greater London and is roughly bounded to the north and west by the London Borough of Havering, to the south by the A13 road and to the east by the M25 motorway. The nearest places are Purfleet, South Ockendon, Wennington and Rainham.

Prehistory and history
Aveley has given its name to the Aveley Interglacial period around 200,000 years ago. Important evidence of the local flora and fauna of the period and some signs of occupation by Neanderthal humans have been found there.

In Domesday the name has various spellings – Alvithelea, Alvileia and Alvilea. The name means Aelfgyth's wood clearing. A variation, in 1418, is Alvythele.

After the Second World War the population grew rapidly as the area absorbed London overspill.

On 1 April 1936 the parish was abolished to form Thurrock.

The Aveley mammoth 
In 1964, amateur geologist John Hesketh found the remains of a late form of steppe mammoth in a clay pit on Sandy Lane. The Natural History Museum excavated the site and uncovered the most complete mammoth skeleton found in the UK, along with a junior straight-tusked elephant found beneath it. The animals were separated by 50,000 years and were originally thought to date back 100,000 and 125,000 years respectively, but recent dating techniques show they died 200,000 and 250,000 years ago.

The skeletons were on display from 1970 to 1990 in the Natural History Museum, before being stored in the museum's palaeontology department for a number of years. They are currently being exhibited in the 'From the Beginning' gallery. Other animal remains were also found at the Aveley site, including a 200,000 year-old jungle cat, a large lion, a brown bear, wolf, rhinoceros, moles, bats, and terrapins.

Notable people
Martina Cole, the crime writer, was brought up in Aveley
Alice Diehl (née Mangold), the novelist and concert pianist, was born in Aveley.
Robert W. Gibson, English-American architect, born in Aveley in 1854.
Kate Evelyn Luard, Royal Red Cross and bar was born in Aveley vicarage.
John Newton, the author of Amazing Grace, lived in Aveley, which was the home of his father's second wife.
Alex Pritchard, professional footballer for Tottenham Hotspur, Brentford and Sunderland lived and went to school in Aveley

Governance 
Aveley forms part of the Thurrock constituency, and is covered by the Aveley and Uplands ward. Their local Member of Parliament (MP) is Jackie Doyle-Price, who was first elected in the 2010 general election, retaining her seat in the 2015, 2017 and 2019 elections. She was appointed Minister of State for Industry during Liz Truss's short-lived premiership before returning to the back benches following the appointment of Rishi Sunak as Prime Minister.

The Aveley and Uplands ward elects three councillors to Thurrock Council. As of May 2022, two were of those elected were members of The Conservative Party and one was a member of The Labour Party.

Historic buildings

St Michael's Church
The parish church of St Michael is a Grade I listed building dating from the 12th century. It contains a 14th-century memorial brass to Radulphus de Knevynton, which is echoed in the arms of the Thurrock unitary authority. The church was declared unsafe in the 19th century, with the recommendation that it should be pulled down. However, this was averted by its parishioners, who raised £1,000 to save it.

Other listed buildings
Grade II*
Brett's Farmhouse
Sir Henry Gurnett public house
Grade II
79, High Street
Crown and Anchor public house
Park Corner House
54 and 56 High Street
Courts Farm, Park Lane.
The core is half of a 13th century timber framed Manor house.
Court's Farmhouse barn - demolished within last 15 yrs to make way for a modern housing estate.
Brett's Farmhouse barn
Aveley Hall

The Old Ship public house at 58 High Street is on the Campaign for Real Ale's National Inventory of Historic Pub Interiors.

Demographics
According to Thurrock Council, the ward of Aveley and Uplands had a population of 8,381 people in 2001.

In 2019 it had an estimated population of 9,461.

Sport
Aveley is the home of non-League football club Aveley, which plays at Parkside. It was also home of now defunct Thurrock, who played at Ship Lane.

Belhus golf course is located in Aveley near the site of the former Belhus Mansion. Much of the remaining land from Belhus forms the Belhus Woods Country Park.

Transport
The nearest railway stations are:
Chafford Hundred railway station
Ockendon railway station
Purfleet railway station

It is also within reach of the M25 Motorway.

Notes

External links

History of Aveley in 1863 Whites Directory
Historic photos of Aveley

 
Towns in Essex
Former civil parishes in Essex
Thurrock